Acquin-Westbécourt is a commune in the Pas-de-Calais department in northern France.

Geography
A village, located 9 miles (15 km) west of Saint-Omer, at the D225 and D208 crossroads.
Seven hamlets are found within the commune: Le val d'Acquin, Lauwerdal, Nordal, Le Poovre, Westbécourt,  Merzoil et and La Wattine.
A large national nature reserve has been created in the area, of great ecological interest.

History
First mentioned by the name of "Atcona" in the 10th century.
Acquin and Westbécourt were joined as a single commune on 1 January 1974.

Population

Sights
 The church of St.Pétronille, dating from the sixteenth century.
 The church of St. Eloi at Westbécourt, dating from the Middle Ages.

See also
Communes of the Pas-de-Calais department

References

Communes of Pas-de-Calais